Máté Valkusz (born 13 August 1998) is a Hungarian tennis player.

Valkusz has a career-high ATP singles ranking of 236, achieved on 30 January 2023.

Junior career

On the junior tour, Valkusz has a career high combined junior ranking of 1 achieved on 11 January 2016. Valkusz was the winner of the 2015 Yucatán Cup, a Grade 1 event in Mérida and the Canadian Open Junior Championships in Repentigny. He was also a semifinalist at the 2015 Orange Bowl and a finalist at the 2015 Osaka Mayor's Cup. Valkusz was also a semifinalist at the 2015 Australian Open boys' doubles and 2015 French Open boys' doubles events.

Challenger and Futures/World Tennis Tour Finals

Singles: 17 (13-4)

Doubles: 3 (3-0)

Davis Cup

Participations: (2–2)

   indicates the outcome of the Davis Cup match followed by the score, date, place of event, the zonal classification and its phase, and the court surface.

Record against other players

Valkusz's match record against players who have been ranked in the top 100, with those who are active in boldface. 
ATP Tour, Challenger and Future tournaments' main draw and qualifying matches are considered.

Personal life
His father Tamás Valkusz was a javelin thrower, and his brother Milán is the member a Hungarian Music Awards winner pop duo VALMAR.

References

External links
 
 
 

1998 births
Living people
Hungarian male tennis players
Tennis players from Budapest
20th-century Hungarian people
21st-century Hungarian people